Courthouse Historic District is a national historic district located at Logansport, Cass County, Indiana. The district encompasses 79 contributing buildings and one contributing site in the central business district of Logansport.  It has a mix of institutional, governmental, and commercial buildings and notable examples of Late Victorian and Romanesque Revival style architecture. Notable contributing resources include the Masonic Hall (1896), Elks Lodge No. 66 (1907), Douglass Building (c. 1915), McCaffey Building (c. 1880), Logansport-Cass County Public Library (1942), The State Theater (c. 1930), United States Post Office (1925), Bank Building (c. 1870), and Watts Building (1901).

It was listed on the National Register of Historic Places in 1999.

References

External links

Historic districts on the National Register of Historic Places in Indiana
Victorian architecture in Indiana
Romanesque Revival architecture in Indiana
Historic districts in Cass County, Indiana
National Register of Historic Places in Cass County, Indiana
Courthouses on the National Register of Historic Places in Indiana
Logansport, Indiana